The Atoms for Peace Award was established in 1955 through a grant of $1,000,000 by the Ford Motor Company Fund. An independent nonprofit corporation was set up to administer the award for the development or application of peaceful nuclear technology. It was created in response to U.S. President Dwight D. Eisenhower's Atoms for Peace speech to the United Nations.  

The 23 recipients were:

1957 – Niels Bohr
1958 – George C. de Hevesy
1959 – Leó Szilárd and Eugene Paul Wigner
1960 – Alvin M. Weinberg and Walter Henry Zinn
1961 – Sir John Cockcroft
1963 – Edwin M. McMillan and Vladimir I. Veksler
1967 – Isidor I. Rabi, W. Bennett Lewis and Bertrand Goldschmidt
1968 – Sigvard Eklund, Abdus Salam, and Henry DeWolf Smyth
1969 – Aage Bohr, Ben Roy Mottelson, Floyd L. Culler, Jr., Henry Kaplan, Anthony L. Turkevich, Mikhail Ioffe and Compton A. Rennie
1969 – Dwight D. Eisenhower

Notes

External links
 Files referring to the award and its presentation in the libraries of the MIT, seen at  libraries.mit.edu, December 2, 2009 (PDF)

Atoms for Peace
Peace awards